is a town located in Fukushima Prefecture, Japan.

Geography
Shinchi is located in the far northeastern Hamadōri region of Fukushima Prefecture, bordering on Miyagi Prefecture to the north and the Pacific Ocean to the east. The population center and town hall is in the northern part of the town, and the western part of the town is hilly.

Surrounding municipalities
Fukushima Prefecture
Sōma
Miyagi Prefecture
Yamamoto
Marumori

Climate
Shinchi has a humid climate (Köppen climate classification Cfa).

Demographics
Per Japanese census data, the population of Shinchi has declined slightly since the year 2000.

History
The area of present-day Shinchi was part of Mutsu Province, and Kofun period remains have been found in the area. During the Nara period, it was part of ancient Futaba District in Iwaki Province.  During the Edo period, it was part of Uda District, which was divided into 51 villages, nine of which (including the coast) was part of the holdings of Sendai Domain, and the remaining 42 of which were ruled by Sōma Domain, ruled by the Sōma clan under the Tokugawa shogunate until the Meiji restoration.  On April 1, 1889, the village of Shinchi was created within Uda District, Fukushima with the establishment of the modern municipalities system. Uda District became Sōma District in 1896. On April 20, 1954, Shinchi annexed the neighboring villages of Fukuda and Komagamine. Shinchi was elevated to town status on August 1, 1971.

2011 earthquake and tsunami
The eastern, coastal portion of Shinchi was inundated by tsunami flood waters following the magnitude 9.0 2011 Tōhoku earthquake and tsunami off its coastline on March 11, 2011. The tsunami destroyed 577 houses, or approximately half the homes in the town, and the final death toll was 116 residents.

Government
Shinchi has a mayor-council form of government with a directly elected mayor and a unicameral town council of 12 members. Shinchi, together with the city of Soma, collectively contributes one seat to the Fukushima Prefectural legislature. In terms of national politics, the city is part of Fukushima 1st district of the lower house of the Diet of Japan.

Economy
The economy of Shinchi is primarily agricultural. The Shinchi Thermal Power Station is located in the town.

Education
Shinchi has three public elementary schools and one public junior high school operated by the town government, and one public high school operated by the Fukushima Prefectural Board of Education.

Transportation

Railway
 East Japan Railway Company (JR East) - Jōban Line
  -

Highway
  - Shinchi Interchange

Local attractions
Shinchi Shell Mound - Tenagamyō Jinja Site, a National Historic Site

Noted people from Shinchi
Arata Endo, architect

References

External links

Official Website 

 
Towns in Fukushima Prefecture
Populated coastal places in Japan